"Brother" is the first single released from Australian indie rock band Little Birdy's third studio album, Confetti. The song reached No. 90 on the Australian Singles Chart, and polled at No. 34 on the Triple J Hottest 100 of 2009. Originally offered as a free download, the song is also the fifth track on the "Summarize" single.

Background 

The song is written by singer and guitarist Katy Steele and features Paul Kelly on backing vocals and harmonica, but for live performances and in the music video for the song, bassist Scott ('Barney') O'Donoghue plays the harmonica.

The song, according to Matt Chequer, was a last minute addition to the album while the band recorded at Melbourne's Sing Sing Studios.

In an interview on Triple J when Steele was queried whether the song was about her brother Luke, she responded "It's about a lot of things. I don't write songs about one thing. I mean yeah, obviously the first line is about him but y'know the second line is about my Dad and the third line's about my Mama. It's really just about family."

Track listing

Charts

References

2009 singles
2009 songs
Little Birdy songs
Eleven: A Music Company singles
Songs written by Katy Steele
Universal Music Group singles